Fax News is an Albanian news television station first launched on 6 October 2017. The station is available on the national digital radio-television network. It's also offered as part of a package plan by ISP provider Abcom, part of the Tring terrestrial platform and can be also streamed online.

See also
Television in Albania
Vizion Plus
Tring
TV Klan
ABC News
Tip TV
Tring Sport
Communication in Albania

Notes and references

Television networks in Albania
Mass media in Tirana
2017 establishments in Albania